Mario Buatta (October 20, 1935 – October 15, 2018) was an American interior decorator.

Early life and education
Born in West Brighton, Staten Island, New York, he was the son of Felice Buatta, who worked as a violinist and bandleader under the name Phil Burton. He was educated at Curtis High School, studied architecture at Wagner College and  Cooper Union, then worked in department stores and took classes in design at Pratt Institute, Columbia University, and in summer 1961 at the Parsons School of Design in Europe. He later received guidance from English designer John Fowler, who greatly influenced him.

Career
Buatta worked for Elisabeth C. Draper and then for Keith Irvine, and started his own business in 1963. He designed interiors for clients including Mariah Carey, Henry Ford II, Malcolm Forbes, Barbara Walters, Nelson Doubleday, Samuel Irving Newhouse, Sr., Charlotte Ford, and Billy Joel. In 1988 with Mark Hampton he oversaw the interior redecoration of Blair House in Washington, D.C. His most extensive work was Carolands, a 92-room chateau located in Hillsborough, California. In addition to his work for clients, he licensed a wide range of products, including a telephone.

Known as the "Prince of Chintz" for his use of lush floral prints, and also as the "King of Clutter", Buatta was greatly influenced by English interior design, especially the Regency period, and known for rooms that evoked the English country house.

Buatta was unusual in the interior design profession in working almost alone, and described himself as "married to [his] business". He was a mainstay of the Kips Bay Decorator Showhouse and from 1977 to 1991 chaired The Winter Show, greatly increasing its prominence as an antiques and design venue.

Personal life and death
Buatta lived in a townhouse in Manhattan, and also owned the 1845 William H. Mason house in Thompson Hill, Connecticut. The house, listed as part of a historic district by the National Register of Historic Places, fell into disrepair, leading to protests of "demolition by neglect".

He died in New York City on October 15, 2018, at the age of 82.

References

Further reading
 

1935 births
2018 deaths
People from West New Brighton, Staten Island
American interior designers
Cooper Union alumni
Curtis High School alumni
Parsons School of Design alumni